General of the Army Mikhail Petrovich Kolesnikov (30 June 1939 – 26 March 2007) was a member of Boris Yeltsin's administration and briefly served as acting Defence Minister of the Russian Federation after Pavel Grachev was fired by Yeltsin.

Kolesnikov also served as Chief of General Staff of the Armed Forces of the Russian Federation from 1992 to 1995.

References

External links 
NUPI entry

 

1939 births
2007 deaths
People from Yeysk
Generals of the army (Russia)
Burials in Troyekurovskoye Cemetery
Recipients of the Order "For Merit to the Fatherland", 3rd class
Deaths from cerebrovascular disease
Recipients of the Order "For Service to the Homeland in the Armed Forces of the USSR", 2nd class
Deputy Defence Ministers of Russia